The Winnipeg Comedy Festival is an annual comedy festival, held in Winnipeg, Manitoba.

Created by the Osborne Village Cultural Centre in collaboration with CBC Radio, performances from the festival are also broadcast as a radio series on CBC Radio One and as a television series on The Comedy Network and CBC Television.

External links
CBC info page
Official Winnipeg Comedy Festival 
Winnipeg Comedy Festival ComedyNightLife.com

Comedy festivals in Canada
Festivals in Winnipeg
CTV Comedy Channel original programming
Canadian comedy radio programs
CBC Radio One programs
Annual events in Winnipeg
Canadian stand-up comedy television series
Arts festivals in Manitoba